Helen Mackenzie may refer to:
Helen Mackenzie (swimmer), New Zealand swimmer in 1950s-1960s
Helen Carruthers Mackenzie (1859–1945), British educationist and public health campaigner
Helen, wife of politician Alexander Mackenzie